Wiesław Bocheński (7 January 1944 – 7 March 2021) was a Polish wrestler. He competed in the men's freestyle +97 kg at the 1968 Summer Olympics.

References

External links
 

1944 births
2021 deaths
Polish male sport wrestlers
Olympic wrestlers of Poland
Wrestlers at the 1968 Summer Olympics
Sportspeople from Warsaw